Armoured Angel were an Australian thrash and death metal band from Canberra, which formed in 1982 as Metal Asylum. The band's founding mainstay, Glen "Lucy" Luck provided bass guitar. They pushed the musical boundaries of the local thrash metal scene and were pioneers of Australian death metal. The group also helped establish Australia's metal festival, Metal for the Brain in 1991. They issued a studio album, Angel of the Sixth Order, in July 1999 before disbanding soon after.

History 

Armoured Angel were formed in 1982 as Metal Asylum by Glen "Lucy" Luck on bass guitar and Rowan Powell on guitars. The band was renamed Armoured Angel in 1984, with drummer Dave Davis and vocalist Rick Wayy completing the line-up. After recording a demo, Baptism in Blood, in 1985, Powell and Wayy were replaced by Tony Sheaffe on guitar and Russell Ruszinski on vocals.

Armoured Angel underwent another line-up change in 1986, reforming as a trio with Lucy joined by the brothers Joel Green (drums, vocals) and Matt Green (guitar). With this line-up, the band recorded a second demo, Wings of Death, in Easter 1989, which gained a strong fan base. A third demo, Communion, was released in 1990. An Australian east coast tour followed, plus a re-release of Wings of Death on English record label CCG in 1991. In 1991, Joel Green organised the Metal for the Brain festival as a benefit concert for his friend, Alec Hurley, who had been assaulted in 1990 and rendered brain-damaged and permanently disabled. The group continued to organise the annual festival until 1996.

Armoured Angel released their first EP, Stigmartyr in December 1992 through Id Records, a development arm of Polygram. The band supported Morbid Angel on their Australian tour that same year. Australian heavy metal magazine Hot Metal awarded a five out of five review for the EP. In January 1993, the band appeared at the Big Day Out festival in Sydney and supported Carcass and Bolt Thrower on their respective Australian tours. The band's second EP Mysterium was released in April 1994. A short tour of the United Kingdom and a headlining show in Germany followed in 1995.

After returning to Australia, Jaz Coleman (of Killing Joke) began producing Armoured Angel's album, in Sydney's Powerhouse Studios in 1996. That same year, Armoured Angel featured at the Melbourne leg of the Big Day Out festival tour. The band split shortly after and the album was never released. Lucy reformed Armoured Angel in 1998 with guitarist and vocalist Yuri Ward (of Psychrist) and drummer Steven Luff. In July 1999 their debut album, Angel of the Sixth Order, was released, on Sydney's Warhead Records. This incarnation of Armoured Angel was short-lived, with the band splitting again late in 1999 after the closure of Warhead Records and the departure of Luff.

According to Australian musicologist, Ian McFarlane, Armoured Angel's "earliest influences included UK bands such as Motorhead and Venom." They pushed the musical boundaries of the local thrash metal scene and were pioneers of Australian death metal.

Aftermath 

After Armoured Angel's disbandment, Lucy performed a short stint in Canberra death metal band, Reign of Terror. Ward continued work with Psychrist, also performing as a live member of Lord Kaos, and later formed death and thrash metallers, Kill for Satan. Joel Green currently performs for doom metallers Witchskull. Lucy and the Green brothers reunited in late 2006 to remaster their back catalogue, including a 1996 pre-production demo of the band's shelved album, Hymns of Hate. A compilation album featuring all of the 1987-1996 line-up's material was released in 2013.

Members 

 Glen "Lucy" Luck – bass guitar 
 Rowan Powell – guitars 
 Dave Davis – drums 
 Rick Wayy – vocals 
 Russell Ruszinski – vocals 
 Tony Sheaffe – guitar 
 Joel Green – drums, vocals 
 Matt Green – guitar 
 Steve Luff – drums 
 Yuri Ward – guitar, vocals

Discography

Demo Recordings

References

External links 
Armoured Angel official Facebook
Stigmartyr Records & Distribution (and Australian metal distro/label whose name is taken from the 1992 EP/Song)

Musical groups established in 1984
Musical groups disestablished in 1999
Australian Capital Territory musical groups
Australian heavy metal musical groups
Australian death metal musical groups
Australian thrash metal musical groups
1984 establishments in Australia